Ipogun-Ayo part of Ifedore local government of Ondo State. Ipogun-Ayo is well known for her rich and preserved culture, academics, agriculture and tourism. Ipogun-Ayo is about 17 km from Ondo state capital, and has Ilara-mokin, Ibule-Soro,itaoniyan,igbara-oke and ile-oluji as neighbouring towns.

References 

Populated places in Ondo State